John Wurster (born January 12, 1948) is an American speed skater. He competed at the 1968 Winter Olympics and the 1972 Winter Olympics.

References

1948 births
Living people
American male speed skaters
Olympic speed skaters of the United States
Speed skaters at the 1968 Winter Olympics
Speed skaters at the 1972 Winter Olympics
Sportspeople from Schenectady, New York